Rameshwor Sharma Chalise better known as Ramesh Bikal (born 1928, near Gokarna, Nepal in the Kathmandu Valley died 2008) was a Nepalese writer and painter who was known for his works portraying rural life and the lives of common people in Nepal.

Early life and education 
He received a B.Ed. in 1960, and worked in education. His early stories had socialist and anti-establishment themes. As a result, he was imprisoned three times between 1949 and 1960. In more recent work, he has focused on sexual relations.

Awards 
Bikal was the first short story writer to be given the Madan Puraskar award. He received the Daulat Bikram Bista Aakhyan Samman Award in 2008 for six decades of contributions to fiction writing in Nepal.

Foundation 
In tribute to his memory, Ramesh Vikal Literary Foundation has been established at Arubari, Gokarneshwor.

Works 
 Birano Deshma ("In an Empty Land"), 1959
 Naya Sadak ko Geet ("The Song of New Road"), 1962
 13 Ramaila Kathaharu ("Thirteen Enjoyable Stories"), 1967
 Aaja Feri Arko Tanna Ferincha ("Today Yet Another Bedspread is Changed"), 1967
 Euta Budo Violin Aashawari ko Dhoon ma ("An Old Violin in the Ashāvari Tune"), 1968
 Agenāko Ḍilmā ("On the Edge of the Hearth"), 1968
 Urmilā Bhāujū ("Sister-in-Law Urmilā"), 1968
 21 Ramālilā Kathāharū ("Twenty-one Enjoyable Stories"), 1968
 Mangal Grahama Bigyan("Bigyan(Science) in Mars")
 Abiral Bagdachha Indrawati ("Indrawati flows continuously")

References 

Nepalese male writers
Nepalese prisoners and detainees
Nepalese activists
Prisoners and detainees of Nepal
1932 births
2008 deaths
People from Kathmandu District
Madan Puraskar winners